OK1 may refer to:
 Phosphoglucan, water dikinase, an enzyme
 PKP class Ok1